The 1917 Oregon Webfoots football team represented the University of Oregon in the Pacific Coast Conference (PCC) during the 1917 college football season. In their sixth and final season under head coach Hugo Bezdek, the Webfoots compiled a 4–3 record (1–2 against PCC opponents), finished in fourth place in the PCC, and were outscored by their opponents, 74 to 73. The team played its home games at Kincaid Field in Eugene, Oregon.

Schedule

References

Oregon
Oregon Ducks football seasons
Oregon Webfoots football